Os Verdes Anos is a 1963 Portuguese drama film directed by Paulo Rocha.

Cast
 Isabel Ruth 
 Rui Gomes 
 Ruy Furtado
 Paulo Renato

References

External links
 

1963 films
Portuguese black-and-white films
1963 drama films
Films directed by Paulo Rocha
Films set in Portugal
Portuguese drama films
1960s Portuguese-language films